This is a list of electoral districts or ridings in Canada for the Canadian federal elections of 1925, 1926 and 1930.

Electoral Districts are constituencies that elect Members of Parliament in Canada's House of Commons every election.

Nova Scotia - 14 seats
Antigonish—Guysborough
Cape Breton North—Victoria
Cape Breton South
Colchester
Cumberland
Digby—Annapolis
Halifax*
Hants—Kings
Inverness
Pictou
Queens—Lunenburg
Richmond—West Cape Breton
Shelburne—Yarmouth

Prince Edward Island - 4 seats
King's
Prince
Queen's*

New Brunswick - 11 seats
Charlotte
Gloucester
Kent
Northumberland
Restigouche—Madawaska
Royal
St. John—Albert*
Victoria—Carleton
Westmorland
York—Sunbury

Quebec - 65 seats
Argenteuil
Bagot
Beauce
Beauharnois
Bellechasse
Berthier—Maskinongé
Bonaventure
Brome—Missisquoi
Cartier
Chambly—Verchères
Champlain
Charlevoix—Saguenay
Châteauguay—Huntingdon
Chicoutimi
Compton
Dorchester
Drummond—Arthabaska
Gaspé
Hochelaga
Hull
Jacques Cartier
Joliette
Kamouraska
L'Assomption—Montcalm 
L'Islet
Labelle
Lake St. John
Laprairie—Napierville
Laurier—Outremont
Laval—Two Mountains
Lévis
Lotbinière
Maisonneuve
Matane
Mégantic
Montmagny
Mount Royal
Nicolet
Pontiac
Portneuf
Quebec East
Quebec South
Quebec West
Québec—Montmorency
Richelieu
Richmond—Wolfe
Rimouski
Shefford
Sherbrooke
St. Ann
St. Antoine
St. Denis
St. Henri
St. Hyacinthe—Rouville
St. James
St. Johns—Iberville
St. Lawrence—St. George
St. Mary
Stanstead
Témiscouata
Terrebonne
Three Rivers—St. Maurice
Vaudreuil—Soulanges
Wright
Yamaska

Ontario - 82 seats
Algoma East
Algoma West
Brant
Brantford City
Bruce North
Bruce South
Carleton
Dufferin—Simcoe
Durham
Elgin West
Essex East
Essex South
Essex West
Fort William
Frontenac—Addington
Glengarry
Grenville—Dundas
Grey North
Grey Southeast
Haldimand
Halton
Hamilton East
Hamilton West
Hamilton South
Hastings South
Hastings—Peterborough
Huron North
Huron South
Kenora—Rainy River
Kent
Kingston City
Lambton East
Lambton West
Lanark
Leeds
Lincoln
London
Middlesex East
Middlesex West
Muskoka—Ontario
Nipissing
Norfolk—Elgin
Northumberland
Ontario
Ottawa (City of)*
Oxford North
Oxford South
Parkdale
Parry Sound
Peel
Perth North
Perth South
Peterborough West
Port Arthur—Thunder Bay
Prescott
Prince Edward—Lennox
Renfrew North
Renfrew South
Russell
Simcoe East
Simcoe North
Stormont
Timiskaming North
Timiskaming South
Toronto East
Toronto East Centre
Toronto Northeast
Toronto Northwest
Toronto South
Toronto West Centre
Toronto—High Park
Toronto—Scarborough
Victoria
Waterloo North
Waterloo South
Welland
Wellington North
Wellington South
Wentworth
York North
York South
York West

Manitoba - 17 seats
Brandon
Dauphin
Lisgar
Macdonald
Marquette
Neepawa
Nelson
Portage la Prairie
Provencher
Selkirk
Souris
Springfield
St. Boniface
Winnipeg North
Winnipeg North Centre
Winnipeg South
Winnipeg South Centre

Saskatchewan - 21 seats
Assiniboia
Humboldt
Kindersley
Last Mountain
Long Lake
Mackenzie
Maple Creek
Melfort
Melville
Moose Jaw
North Battleford
Prince Albert
Qu'Appelle
Regina
Rosetown
Saskatoon
South Battleford
Swift Current
Weyburn
Willow Bunch
Yorkton

Alberta - 16 seats
Acadia
Athabaska
Battle River
Bow River
Calgary East
Calgary West
Camrose
Edmonton East
Edmonton West
Lethbridge
Macleod
Medicine Hat
Peace River
Red Deer
Vegreville
Wetaskiwin

British Columbia - 14 seats
Cariboo
Comox—Alberni
Fraser Valley
Kootenay East
Kootenay West
Nanaimo
New Westminster
Skeena
Vancouver Centre
Vancouver North
Vancouver South
Vancouver—Burrard
Victoria
Yale

Yukon - 1 seat
Yukon
*returned two members

1924-1933